James Duke was a Scottish professional footballer who played as a centre-half.

References

Footballers from East Ayrshire
Scottish footballers
Association football defenders
Grimsby Town F.C. players
Scunthorpe United F.C. players
Bristol City F.C. players
Exeter City F.C. players
English Football League players
Year of birth missing